Troy Ball Club Grounds was a baseball ground in Watervliet, New York. It was home to the Troy Trojans baseball club of the National League for the 1882 season.

References 
Retrosheet. "Park Directory". Retrieved 2006-09-04.

External links
Seamheads.com Ballparks Database: Troy Ball Club Grounds

Sports venues in Albany County, New York
Defunct baseball venues in the United States
Baseball venues in New York (state)
Watervliet, New York